Mawlawi Mohammed Islam Mohammadi (1921 – January 26, 2007) was a Taliban governor and member of the National Assembly of Afghanistan. He was regional governor of Bamyan Province in Afghanistan when the Buddhas of Bamyan were destroyed in 2001.

In 2005, he was elected to parliament by the neighboring province of Samangan, as election laws in post-Taliban reconstruction Afghanistan did not prevent former Taliban officials from running for election. On January 26, 2007, he was assassinated in Kabul on his way to prayers.

References

2007 deaths
Taliban governors
Members of the House of the People (Afghanistan)
Assassinated Afghan politicians
People murdered in Afghanistan
Pashtun people
1921 births
Governors of Bamyan Province